Tubreh Riz (also Romanized as Tūbreh Rīz; also known as Tubreh and Turba Rez) is a village in Shahu Rural District, in the Central District of Kamyaran County, Kurdistan Province, Iran. At the 2006 census, its population was 3,309, in 824 families. The village is populated by Kurds.

References 

Towns and villages in Kamyaran County
Kurdish settlements in Kurdistan Province